Traeshon Holden (born August 12, 2001) is an American football wide receiver. Holden attended and played high school football at Narbonne High School in Los Angeles, California and began his college career playing for the Alabama Crimson Tide in 2020.

Early years and high school career
Born in Kissimmee, Florida, Holden attended and played high school football St. Frances Academy in Baltimore, Maryland before transferring to Narbonne High School in Los Angeles, California for his senior season. Holden was rated a four-star prospect and committed to play college football at Alabama over offers from Clemson, Florida, Oregon, and USC.

College career

Alabama
In his true freshman season, Holden played in five games but didn't have any receptions.

In Holden's sophomore season, he played in 15 games and finished the season with 21 receptions for 239 receiving yards. Holden played in the 2022 College Football Playoff National Championship game against the Georgia Bulldogs and he finished the game with 6 receptions for 28 yards in the 33–18 loss.

Oregon 
On December 11, 2022, Holden transferred to Oregon. On February 15, 2023, he was dismissed from the team following his felony arrest.

College statistics

References

External links
 Alabama Crimson Tide bio

2001 births
Living people
American football wide receivers
Alabama Crimson Tide football players
Players of American football from Florida
People from Kissimmee, Florida
Sportspeople from Greater Orlando
Oregon Ducks football players